Jonas Björkman and Thomas Johansson won the title, defeating Thomas Enqvist and Magnus Norman in the final, 4–3(5–4), 1–4, 4–3(5–3).

Draw

Finals

Newcombe group
Standings are determined by: 1. number of wins; 2. number of matches; 3. in two-players-ties, head-to-head records; 4. in three-players-ties, percentage of sets won, or of games won; 5. steering-committee decision.

Roche group
Standings are determined by: 1. number of wins; 2. number of matches; 3. in two-players-ties, head-to-head records; 4. in three-players-ties, percentage of sets won, or of games won; 5. steering-committee decision.

References

Draw 

Legends Men's Doubles